The 2013 Città di Caltanissetta was a professional tennis tournament played on clay courts. It was the 15th edition of the tournament which was part of the 2013 ATP Challenger Tour. It took place in Caltanissetta, Italy between 3 and 9 June 2013.

Singles main draw entrants

Seeds

 1 Rankings are as of May 27, 2013.

Other entrants
The following players received wildcards into the singles main draw:
  Martin Kližan
  Salvatore Caruso
  Marco Cecchinato
  Potito Starace

The following player received entry using a protected ranking:
  Eduardo Schwank

The following players received entry as an alternate into the singles main draw:
  Alessandro Giannessi

The following players received entry from the qualifying draw:
  Andrea Arnaboldi
  Juan Carlos Sáez
  Andrés Molteni
  Philipp Oswald

Doubles main draw entrants

Seeds

1 Rankings as of May 27, 2013.

Other entrants
The following pairs received wildcards into the doubles main draw:
  Marco Cecchinato /  Alessio di Mauro
  Omar Giacalone /  Gianluca Naso
  Walter Trusendi /  Matteo Viola

Champions

Singles

 Dušan Lajović def.  Robin Haase, 7–6(7–4), 6–3

Doubles

 Dominik Meffert /  Philipp Oswald def.  Alessandro Giannessi /  Potito Starace, 6–2, 6–3

External links
Official Website

Citta di Caltanissetta
Città di Caltanissetta